Six Million Dollar Man, full title Theme from Six Million Dollar Man and Other Selections, is an album by organist Richard "Groove" Holmes, featuring material arranged and conducted by Oliver Nelson, recorded in 1975 and released by the Flying Dutchman label.

Track listing
All compositions by Oliver Nelson except where noted
 "Disc-O-Mite" (Richard "Groove" Holmes, Oliver Nelson) − 5:20
 "Salsa de Alma" (Holmes) − 5:20
 "Once Is Not Enough" (Henry Mancini, Larry Kusic) − 3:26
 "Dumpy Mama" − 4:45
 "Six Million Dollar Man Theme" − 5:54
 "Double Scale" (Tom Scott) − 4:11
 "125th St. and 7th Avenue" − 3:37
 "Mama's Groove" (Holmes) − 7:06

Personnel
Richard "Groove" Holmes − organ
Oscar Brashear, Charles Findley (tracks 3 & 5), Bobby Bryant (tracks 3 & 5) − trumpet
Lloyd Ulyate, Garnett Brown, Maurice Spears − trombone (tracks 3 & 5)
Tom Scott − tenor saxophone, flute, arranger, conductor
Bud Shank, Jerome Richardson, Jack Nimitz, Gene Cipriano − woodwinds (tracks 3 & 5) 
Mike Wofford − piano, electric piano, ARP synthesizer
David T. Walker − electric guitar
Chuck Domanico (tracks 3 & 5), Chuck Rainey (tracks 1, 2, 4 & 6-8) − electric bass
Jimmy Gordon (tracks 1, 2, 4 & 6-8), Shelly Manne (track 5) − drums
Mailto Correa, Larry Bunker (tracks 3 & 5) − percussion
Oliver Nelson − arranger, conductor (tracks 1-5, 7 & 8)

References

1975 albums
Albums produced by Bob Thiele
Flying Dutchman Records albums
RCA Records albums
Richard Holmes (organist) albums
Albums conducted by Oliver Nelson
Albums arranged by Oliver Nelson